Ersoy is a Turkish surname. Er means man or soldier and soy means ancestry. Notable people with this surname include:
 Başak Ersoy (born 1991), Turkish female footballer
 Bülent Ersoy (born 1952), Turkish singer
 Mehmet Ersoy (born 1968), Turkish businessperson and current Minister of Culture and Tourism
 Mehmet Akif Ersoy (1873-1936), Turkish poet
 Muazzez Ersoy (born 1958), Turkish female singer
 Okan Ersoy, Turkish-American scientist
 Şükrü Ersoy (born 1931), Turkish footballer
 Uğur Ersoy (born 1932), Turkish engineer and academic 

Turkish-language surnames